Praphas Charusathien (25 November 1912 – 18 August 1997) was a Thai military officer and politician. He was a field marshal (chom phon) of the Royal Thai Army and minister of interior in the governments of military rulers Sarit Thanarat and Thanom Kittikachorn.

Personal life and education
Praphas graduated from the Chulachomklao Royal Military Academy and became an infantry officer. He was sponsored by Field Marshal and Prime Minister-to-be Sarit Thanarat. He was quickly promoted to higher ranks. In 1957, Sarit appointed him minister of interior, a position in which he continued to serve after Sarit's death in 1963. The new Prime Minister was Thanom Kittikachorn, whose son married Praphas' daughter. From 1963 to 1973, he was additionally deputy prime minister and Commander-in-Chief of the Royal Thai Army. During this time, Praphas was the strong man in the background who pulled the strings in the Thanom government. He was known for obscure financial transactions and political intrigues, while sitting on the boards of 44 companies.

In 1973, he was replaced as army commander by Gen.Krit Srivara, which signaled his loss of influence. In October 1973 protests against the rigid military rule grew into a massive popular uprising that was answered by a bloody crackdown on the protesting students and democracy activists. The many dead civilians prompted King Bhumibol Adulyadej to intervene. Praphas, Thanom and his son-in-law Col.Narong Kittikachorn went into exile.

Praphas returned to Thailand in January 1977, after the military had ended the democratic interlude in October 1976. However, he was not able to exercise political influence again.

Family
Praphas married to Thanpuying Sawai Jarusathien, daughter of Lt. Von and Huai Panprasit. They have a total of 6 children. Praphas's children were married to important people with military and political power, including Supaporn Charusathien married with Narong Kittikachorn son of Thanom Kittikachorn, Orapan Charusathien married with Yuthasak Sasiprapha and Supanapa Charusathien married with Somtat Attanand.

Died
Praphas Charusathien died on 18 August 1997 in Bangkok.

Honours
received the following royal decorations in the Honours System of Thailand:

 1964 -  Knight Grand Cross of the Most Illustrious Order of Chula Chom Klao
 1973 -  Knight Grand Commander of the Honourable Order of Rama
 1959 -  Knight Grand Cordon of the Most Exalted Order of the White Elephant
 1957 -  Knight Grand Cordon of the Most Noble Order of the Crown of Thailand
 1988 -  Member of the Order of Symbolic Propitiousness Ramkeerati
 1934 -  Dushdi Mala Medal - Military, Acts of Bravery 
 1941 -  Victory Medal - Indochina
 1962 -  Victory Medal - World War II
 1969 -  Freeman Safeguarding Medal - 1st Class 
 1934 -  Safeguarding the Constitution Medal
 1958 -  Border Service Medal 
 1945 -  Chakra Mala Medal
 1950 -  King Rama VIII Royal Cypher Medal - 3rd Class
 1959 -  King Rama IX Royal Cypher Medal - 2nd Class

Foreign honours

  :

1957 -  Grand Cross of the Cross of Military Merit
  : 
1964 -  Honorary Grand Commander of the Order of the Defender of the Realm

  :

1964 -  Grand Officer of the Order of Leopold

  :

1966 -  Grand Cordon of the Order of the Rising Sun

  :

1966 -  Order of Service Merit, 1st 
  :

1967 -  Grand Cross of the Order of St. Olav

  :

1967 -  Commander 1st Class of the Order of the Sword

  :

1967 -  Grand Decoration of the Decoration of Honour for Services to the Republic of Austria
  :
 Grand Cross with Sash and Star of the Order of Merit of the Federal Republic of Germany
 :
 Grand Officer of the Order of Orange-Nassau
 :
 Knight Grand Cross of the Order of Merit of the Italian Republic
 :
 Commander of the Legion of Merit

Notes

References

Charusathien, Praphas
Charusathien, Praphas
Praphas Charusathien
Praphas Charusathien
Praphas Charusathien
Praphas Charusathien
Praphas Charusathien
Praphas Charusathien
Praphas Charusathien
Praphas Charusathien
Grand Crosses with Star and Sash of the Order of Merit of the Federal Republic of Germany
Praphas Charusathien